Saint-Denis-en-Val is a commune in the Loiret department in north-central France.

Population

See also
 Communes of the Loiret department

References

Saintdenisenval